The Boys Whose Head Exploded is a rare live performances bootleg compilation by English post-punk band The Pop Group, released on 27 May 2016 through Freaks R Us.

Track listing

Personnel 
Adapted from The Boys Whose Head Exploded liner notes.

The Pop Group
 Dan Catsis – bass guitar
 Gareth Sager – saxophone, clarinet, piano, organ, guitar
 Bruce Smith – drums, percussion
 Mark Stewart – vocals
 John Waddington – guitar, bass guitar

Release history

References

External links 
 The Boys Whose Head Exploded at Discogs (list of releases)
 The Boys Whose Head Exploded at Bandcamp

2016 live albums
The Pop Group albums